Mauree Nivek Rajah Salima Turner (born 1992 or 1993) is an American politician and community organizer. A member of the Democratic Party, they have served as a member of the Oklahoma House of Representatives since 2021. Turner is the first publicly non-binary U.S. state lawmaker and the first Muslim member of the Oklahoma Legislature. They have previously served as a board member of the Council on American–Islamic Relations and led criminal justice reform initiatives with the American Civil Liberties Union.

Early life 
Turner is from Ardmore, Oklahoma.  They are a Muslim, raised in an interfaith Baptist and Muslim household. Their family received public assistance from the Supplemental Nutrition Assistance Program, and their father spent time in prison. Turner graduated from Ardmore High School and attended Oklahoma State University.

Community organizing
Turner was a board member of the Council on American–Islamic Relations and led the "Campaigning for Smart Justice" criminal justice reform initiative of the American Civil Liberties Union.

Oklahoma House of Representatives (2021—present)

2020 campaign and first term
In the 2020 elections, Turner ran as a Democrat for the Oklahoma House of Representatives in district 88, held by incumbent Democrat Jason Dunnington. The district is located in Central Oklahoma City, primarily to the southeast of Interstate 44 and to the west of Interstate 235, containing the campus of Oklahoma City University. Turner's 2020 election campaign was focused on criminal justice reform. Turner defeated Dunnington in the primary election and was backed by U.S. Representative Ilhan Omar. In the general election, they defeated Kelly Barlean, the Republican nominee, in a landslide, with approximately 71% of the vote. During the general election, Turner was also endorsed by Mayor Pete Buttigieg and Senator Elizabeth Warren. Turner is the first publicly non-binary US state lawmaker and the first Muslim member of the Oklahoma Legislature.

Turner first served in the 58th Oklahoma Legislature. During the 58th legislative session, Turner was an outspoken critic of multiple anti-LGBT bills proposed in the legislature. Specifically, Turner worked against bills that would seek to bar transgender athletes from competing in the sports of their gender. Turner has described the legislature as unwelcoming towards them. They have said, "sometimes, I’m like, 'This does feel like a direct attack on me… I think it is also folks who come into these bodies that aren't prepared to do the real work, but want to legislate from a place of bigotry, or a place of fear." Of the fourteen bills Turner filed in the first session, none were given a committee hearing by the Republican-led Oklahoma House of Representatives.

Re-election campaign and second term
Turner was reelected in the 2022 elections. In 2023, the American Civil Liberties Union of Oklahoma issued a statement criticizing the Oklahoma House of Representatives  for tabling Turner's proposed amendments to the chamber's dress code rules that would have made the rules gender neutral.

House censure
On February 28, 2023 the Oklahoma House of Representatives passed H.B. 2177; the bill would ban gender-affirming medical care for trans children. During protests that day, a protestor allegedly tossed water on Representative Bob Ed Culver Jr. and had a physical interaction with an police officer. After the altercation, the protestor was locked in Turner's office; The Oklahoma Highway Patrol alleged Turner refused to unlock the office when they communicated with them through the door. On March 7, the Republican-controlled Oklahoma House voted along party lines to censure Representative Turner. They were also removed from their committee assignments until a written apology is sent to the Oklahoma Highway Patrol and Speaker Charles McCall. Turner denied wrongdoing saying "“I just provide my office as space of grace and love for all the folks in all communities that seek refuge from the hate in this building... Trans people don't feel safe here.” They also declined to apologize, stating "I think an apology for loving the people of Oklahoma is something that I cannot do.” Oklahoma House Democrats criticized the censure because no investigation was done before the censure, Turner had not committed a crime, and because multiple members of the Republican majority currently facing felony indictment have yet to be censured.

Personal life 
Turner is a queer and non-binary femme, and uses they/them pronouns.
They were endorsed in their 2022 re-election campaign by the Oklahoma City chapter of the Democratic Socialists of America.

Electoral history

Notes

References

External links
 

Living people
1990s births
Year of birth missing (living people)
Place of birth missing (living people)
Democratic Party members of the Oklahoma House of Representatives
African-American state legislators in Oklahoma
LGBT state legislators in Oklahoma
Non-binary politicians
LGBT African Americans
Queer people
21st-century American politicians
Activists from Oklahoma
African-American activists
African-American Muslims
LGBT Muslims
Oklahoma State University alumni
People from Ardmore, Oklahoma
Politicians from Oklahoma City